Art of Movement (AOM) is a Seattle-based b-boy crew founded in 2002 by brothers Junior and Tony Orduna. The crew received attention due to member Jay Park's popularity as a singer and rapper. Cha Cha Malone is a producer and composer, and works closely with Jay Park, and Dial Tone won R-16 Korea in 2012 with Massive Monkees, another Seattle-based b-boy crew. The crew has appeared on numerous nationally-broadcast TV shows in South Korea, performed worldwide, and appeared in many music videos, exposing the b-boy culture to a wide variety of people.

History
Art of Movement (AOM) started as an idea between brothers Junior Orduna & Tony Orduna in 2000. Along with a few friends, they danced for fun in middle school, and by 2002, AOM became an official crew consisting of a handful of members. After the Orduna brothers relocated to north Seattle, they were introduced to other dancers. In 2003, AOM saw the addition of Jay Park, Chase Malone (Cha Cha Malone), Leng Phe (Phé La Roc), Gil, Neil, and Bao, Chico (Ace Chico) and Daniel Jerome (StepRoc). Over the years, members have pursued other endeavors, such as Jay Park, who went to South Korea in 2005, but have returned to work together, earning a reputation as one of the more respected crews to represent Seattle and the West Coast. The crew has travelled worldwide, performing at concerts in Singapore, Malaysia, the Philippines, and Indonesia, and participating in large b-boy battles, such as R-16 Korea, and have appeared on numerous TV shows in South Korea.

On April 2, 2013, AOM member Jay Park released a video titled "Art of Movement (2013)" on his YouTube channel. The video was filmed in March 2013, and edited by fellow AOM member Hep, showing the crew b-boying and posing on the banks of Puget Sound, with the Seattle Great Wheel in the background, in the crew's hometown of Seattle over the soundtrack of "Stop Me" by Mark Ronson.

Awards

References

External links
 

American breakdancing groups
American hip hop dance groups
Organizations based in Seattle
2002 establishments in Washington (state)